Mariano Damián Barbosa (born 27 July 1984) is an Argentine professional footballer who plays as a goalkeeper.

Club career
Born in Lanús, Buenos Aires, Barbosa started his career with Club Atlético Banfield in 2002. In 2005, he was signed by Spanish club Villarreal CF for a fee of €2 million alongside another player in his position, Sebastián Viera.

Barbosa served mainly as reserve at Villarreal, but filled in for Viera in several games, most notably in the semi-finals of the 2005–06 UEFA Champions League against Arsenal. Even though he did not let in any goals in the second leg, the English had won 1–0 in the first match for an eventual qualification.

In the summer of 2007, after the signing of Diego López, Barbosa was allowed to join fellow La Liga side Recreativo de Huelva. Barred by Italian Stefano Sorrentino, he made no appearances during his sole season.

In 2008, Barbosa returned to his country and joined Estudiantes de La Plata, being loaned to fellow Argentine Primera División team Club Atlético River Plate the following year. After an unsuccessful spell, he was sold to Club Atlas of Mexico on 7 July 2009.

After one year with Atlas, Barbosa returned to Spain and signed for UD Las Palmas of the Segunda División. He was an undisputed started during his spell in the Canary Islands, never playing less than 37 league matches.

Barbosa moved to Sevilla FC on 16 July 2014 on a free transfer, penning a two-year deal. On 15 June of the following year, having been demoted to third choice after the emergence of Sergio Rico, he terminated his contract.

On 9 July 2015, Barbosa returned to Villarreal after agreeing to a two-year deal. He acted as starter during the first part of the 2017–18 campaign, due to the serious knee injuries of Sergio Asenjo and Andrés Fernández.

International career
Barbosa was second-choice for the Argentina under-20 team that reached the semi-finals of the FIFA World Cup in 2003, eventually finishing in fourth place. He replaced suspended Gustavo Eberto in the round-of-16 game against Egypt, a 2–1 win.

References

External links
Argentine League statistics  

1984 births
Living people
Sportspeople from Lanús
Argentine footballers
Association football goalkeepers
Argentine Primera División players
Club Atlético Banfield footballers
Estudiantes de La Plata footballers
Club Atlético River Plate footballers
La Liga players
Segunda División players
Villarreal CF players
Recreativo de Huelva players
UD Las Palmas players
Sevilla FC players
Liga MX players
Atlas F.C. footballers
Argentina under-20 international footballers
Argentine expatriate footballers
Expatriate footballers in Spain
Expatriate footballers in Mexico
Argentine expatriate sportspeople in Spain
Argentine expatriate sportspeople in Mexico